Nītaure Parish is an administrative territorial entity of Cēsis Municipality in the Vidzeme region of Latvia. The administrative center is Nītaure.

Towns, villages and settlements of Nītaure Parish 
 Merķeļi
 Nītaure

External links 
 

Parishes of Latvia
Cēsis Municipality
Vidzeme